Thomas Lawlor (died 29 October 1945) was an Irish Labour Party politician and trade union official.

In 1925 the Labour Party identified high taxation as a government weakness and decided to contest the Dublin South and Dublin North by-elections. Lawlor, as general secretary of the Irish Municipal Employees' Trade Union was the candidate in Dublin South, with Denis Cullen of the Irish Bakers Union running in Dublin North. Neither of them were elected.

Lawlor was first elected to Dáil Éireann as a Labour Party Teachta Dála (TD) for the Dublin South constituency at the June 1927 general election. He lost his seat at the September 1927 general election. He was an unsuccessful candidate at the 1932 general election but re-gained his seat at the 1937 general election. He lost his seat again at the 1938 general election.

References

Year of birth missing
1945 deaths
Irish trade unionists
Labour Party (Ireland) TDs
Members of the 5th Dáil
Members of the 9th Dáil
Politicians from County Dublin